TWR may mean:
 Tom Walkinshaw Racing, a racing team and engineering company founded in 1976 
 Trans World Radio, a multinational Christian evangelistic broadcaster
 Traveling wave reactor, a type of nuclear reactor that would convert fertile material into fissile fuel
 Tokyo Waterfront Area Rapid Transit, Japan
 Thrust-to-Weight Ratio of an aircraft or spaceship engine.
 Time-weighted return is a method of calculating investment return.
 Tuas West Road MRT station, Mass Rapid Transit station in Singapore, MRT station abbreviation
 Tyne and Wear, county in England, Chapman code